Canadaga (meaning "Canadian bird") is a flightless bird genus from the Late Cretaceous. The single known species is Canadaga arctica. It lived in the shallow seas around what today is Bylot Island in Nunavut, Canada. Its fossils were found in rocks dated to the mid-Maastrichtian age, about 67 million years ago.

It was a member of the Hesperornithes, flightless toothed seabirds of the Cretaceous. Among these, it belonged to the Hesperornithidae, along with Hesperornis, the well-known namesake genus.

It also represents one of the last known members of the lineage. Unlike its relatives which are mainly known from subtropical or tropical waters, this species seems to have ranged in temperate or even subarctic areas.

The species is described from 3 associated cervical vertebrae, one caudal vertebra and two femurs.

References

Bird genera
Late Cretaceous birds of North America
Hesperornitheans
Extinct flightless birds